Arkansas held a general election on November 3, 1936. At the top of the ticket, Franklin D. Roosevelt won the state handily in his reelection bid. Arkansans reelected Joe T. Robinson to the United States Senate for a fifth term. For the United States House of Representatives, the six Representatives seeking reelection were unopposed in the general election. In the Arkansas 7th, Wade Kitchens replaced a retiring Tilman B. Parks.

All of Arkansas's statewide constitutional offices were up for reelection, including governor. During the Solid South, the Democratic Party held firm control of virtually every office in The South, including Arkansas. Winning the Democratic primary was considered tantamount to election, with several different factions of the party battling in the open primaries.  Incumbent J. Marion Futrell retired from politics and was replaced by Attorney General of Arkansas Carl E. Bailey; all other state constitutional offices were held by the Democrats without general election opposition.

Federal

President

Senate

United States House

State

Governor

Lieutenant Governor 
Bob Bailey (no relation to Carl Bailey) won the nomination for Lieutenant Governor of Arkansas from a five-candidate field in the Democratic primary.

Bailey defeated Republican and Communist challengers by a wide margin in the general election.

Attorney General

Secretary of State

Auditor

Treasurer

State Land Commissioner

See also

References 

 
1936